The Commander in Chief Naval Fleet (CINCNAV) is a post in the Italian Navy that is responsible for the operational aspects of the Italian Navy, including ships, submarines and aircraft.
The post was established in 1952 and since 1972 has been based in Santa Rosa near Rome.

Organisation

References

Italian Navy